Third Front may refer to:

 Third Front (China), an economic/military reserve
 Third Front (India), a political alliance